Mr. Belvedere is an American sitcom that originally aired on ABC from March 15, 1985, to July 8, 1990. The series is based on the Lynn Aloysius Belvedere character created by Gwen Davenport for her 1947 novel Belvedere, which was later adapted into the 1948 film Sitting Pretty. The sitcom stars Christopher Hewett as the title character, who takes a job as a butler with an American family headed by George Owens, played by Bob Uecker.

Premise
The series follows posh English butler Lynn Belvedere as he struggles to adapt to the Owens household in suburban Pittsburgh. The breadwinner, George (Bob Uecker), is a sportswriter (in the pilot he worked in construction). His wife Marsha (Ilene Graff) is attending law school. At the show's start, older son Kevin (Rob Stone) is a senior in high school, daughter Heather (Tracy Wells) is a freshman, and Wesley (Brice Beckham) is in elementary school. Over the course of the series, George becomes a sportscaster (a career shared with Uecker, who balanced his role as the longtime play-by-play announcer for the Milwaukee Brewers while starring in the series), Marsha graduates from law school and starts a career as a lawyer, Kevin leaves for college and gets his own apartment, Heather moves up in high school, and Wesley moves up to junior high.

Several episodes deal with the relationship between Wesley and Mr. Belvedere, who are always at odds with each other, with Wesley constantly antagonizing Belvedere. Deep down, they are revealed to really love each other. In season two's "Wesley's Friend" – one of the series' many very special episodes – Danny, one of Wesley's classmates, contracts HIV via factor VIII treatment for hemophilia (the same way Ryan White contracted HIV). Danny is taken out of school due to the ignorance and uncertainty shared by the parents of many of the other children at Wesley's school. After hearing rumors from his friends about how HIV can be spread, leading them to shun him if he keeps spending time with Danny, Wesley begins to avoid Danny in fear of getting the disease himself. Mr. Belvedere is there for him and the child, and he helps Wesley to shed his fear of the boy and publicly accept him as his friend.

Throughout the series, Mr. Belvedere serves as a mentor of sorts to Wesley, as well as to the other children. Being a cultured man with many skills and achievements (having even once worked for Winston Churchill), he also comes to serve as some sort of a "counselor" to the Owens clan, helping them solve their dilemmas and stay out of mischief. Belvedere is the only one who can tame Wesley.

Each episode, except "Deportation Part 1" (season three) and "The Counselor" (season four), ends with Mr. Belvedere writing in his journal, recounting the events of the day (which is heard by the audience via his narration) with the Owens family and what he gets out of it in terms of a lesson.

A frequent gag on the show involves Heather's air-headed best friend Angela (Michele Matheson), who almost always mispronounces Mr. Belvedere's name (such as calling him "Mr. Bumpersticker", "Mr. Bellpepper", "Mr. Butterfinger" or "Mr. Velveeta"). Belvedere's penchant for junk food is shown in many episodes, often being playfully mocked by other characters. Another frequent gag involves George and Mr. Belvedere butting heads, with George being annoyed with his "nosy English housekeeper" always interfering. Yet another recurring gag features George always trying to be initiated into a local charity club, the "Happy Guys of Pittsburgh". Wesley's highly acrimonious relationship with the never-seen next door neighbors, the Hufnagels (whose first names all began with the letter H), and the shenanigans he pulls on them is another recurring plot element.

Production

Development
The character of Lynn Belvedere was originally created by Gwen Leys Davenport in her 1947 novel, Belvedere. The following year, the title character was portrayed by Clifton Webb in the film Sitting Pretty, which told the story of an arrogant genius who answers an employment advertisement for a babysitter for three bratty kids. He accepts such employment because he is secretly writing a novel about a community filled with gossips and busybodies. Webb's performance in the film earned him an Academy Award nomination for Best Actor, and he reprised the role in two more films, Mr. Belvedere Goes to College (1949) and Mr. Belvedere Rings the Bell (1951).

As early as the 1950s, attempts were made to adapt the character to television. Three pilots for a proposed series based on the Belvedere character were made during the 1950s and 1960s, a 1956 attempt starring Reginald Gardiner, a 1959 effort with Hans Conried, and a 1965 version starring Victor Buono in the title role. All efforts, however, were unsuccessful until 1985, when ABC picked up Mr. Belvedere to series to serve as a mid-season replacement, with British actor Christopher Hewett playing Lynn Belvedere.

Pre-production
The series' co-creators and executive producers, Frank Dungan and Jeff Stein, pitched the series as "a very elegant, very British sophisticate hired to restore order to a chaotic household in a Pittsburgh suburb". The show eventually developed with an upper-middle-class family in suburban Beaver Falls, Pennsylvania, albeit a highly-fictionalized version of Beaver Falls. According to Dungan and Stein, Pittsburgh was chosen as the show's setting because "it was either Pittsburgh or Paris, and Paris doesn't have the Penguins... we wanted someplace with seasons and sporting activity... A city kinda going through a resurgence... with character and traditions that is moving into the '80s, a blue-collar community that is moving into the up-and-coming, yet with the traditional spirit of the country. From everything we've read, Pittsburgh is moving into high tech". The prediction of moving into high tech would eventually prove to be true, as several tech companies have since set up major offices in Pittsburgh long after the series ended.

Weeks after Pittsburgh was chosen as the show's setting, the city was named by Rand-McNally as the most livable American city. The show's produces promised to use this "national publicity". Both Dungan (who hailed from Philadelphia) and Stein (who is from Cleveland) admitted to never having been to Pittsburgh prior to developing the series, though Dungan's sister attended Carnegie Mellon University (at the time, CMU's robotics department was in its infancy, which would lead to Pittsburgh's renaissance as a tech hub after the series ended): "I remember for four years she talked about how Pittsburgh was changing, and about how different it was from Philadelphia". Stein admitted that early on, "we thought about setting the show in Cleveland, but that's too jokey" and that "we're not doing Pittsburgh jokes. We like Pittsburgh. We like the Pittsburgh Steelers. That's a classy ballclub. And we like Willie Stargell". No scenes from the pilot nor the first season's six episodes were shot in Pennsylvania, but the producers promised if they "get picked up for fall [1985–86], we'll probably come to Pittsburgh".

The producers educated themselves on Pittsburgh locales with a promotional calendar provided by the Pittsburgh Media Group (PMG), a consortium of public officials and Western Pennsylvania media. Dungan and Stein used it for story ideas during season one after the PMG pitched several studio groups in Los Angeles in January 1985: "People were impressed... the calendar has Pittsburgh scenes for each month. The Bridge of Sighs is February. The PPG Building is March. Three Rivers Stadium gets three months".

Cast

Main cast
 Christopher Hewett as Mr. Lynn Belvedere
 Ilene Graff as Marsha Cameron Owens
 Rob Stone as Kevin Owens
 Tracy Wells as Heather Owens
 Brice Beckham as Wesley T. Owens
 Bob Uecker as George Owens

Recurring cast
 Casey Ellison as Miles Knobnoster, Wesley's best friend, who is always the butt of jokes due to his orthodontic headgear.
 Michele Matheson as Angela Shostakovich, Heather's somewhat dimwitted best friend, who always mispronounces Mr. Belvedere's name. Angela's middle name, Raskolnikov, was mentioned in one episode.
 Raleigh Bond as Burt Hammond, bombastic and overly talkative chief spokesman and membership director for the Happy Guys of Pittsburgh, a local men's club; he is always trying to recruit George as a member. His final appearance was in the season five episode "Stakeout", as Bond died eight months after the show was taped.
 Jack Dodson as Carl Butlam, Mr. Hammond's obsequious assistant. 
 Winifred Freedman as Wendy, Kevin's overweight, geeky and self-conscious high school friend who has a crush on him.
 Robert Goulet, singer and actor, who plays himself. Occasionally sings duets with Marsha. George finds him to be irritating.
 Norman Bartold as Skip Hollings, George's co-anchor at the television station. Prior to the character's first appearance in season four, Bartold played as a hotel clerk in a season three episode.
 Willie Garson as Carl, Kevin's best friend, who's always dragging Kevin into one of his schemes. 
 Patti Yasutake (or by Maggie Han in some episodes) as Tami, one of George's co-anchors at the television station.
 Laura Mooney as Marjorie, a Junior High student, and one of Wesley's love interests during the final season. Prior to playing the character in season six, Mooney appeared as "Roberta" in a season four episode.

Episodes

Theme song and opening sequence
The show's theme song, "According to Our New Arrival", was performed by ragtime singer Leon Redbone. It was written by Judy Hart-Angelo and Gary Portnoy, who also co-wrote the theme songs to Cheers and Punky Brewster. In the original unaired pilot, an unidentified studio vocalist sang the theme.

The song was composed in 1984 for a rejected television pilot called Help (which was later resurrected in 1987 as Marblehead Manor, produced by Paramount Television and aired in first-run syndication). With a minor lyrical rewrite (changing the word "arrivals" to "arrival"), it quickly became the theme song to Mr. Belvedere. In 2007, Portnoy released a never-before-heard full-length version of the theme on his CD, Destiny.

The show used four different closing themes during its original run:
 The unaired Pilot and early ABC promos of the show used a rock version of the main theme, with a guitar lead.
 Seasons 1 and 2 and one Season 3 episode featured an instrumental version of the theme song.
 Season 3 featured a Dixieland rendition of the ending theme.
 Seasons 4-6 employed a jazzier rendition of the ending theme.

Opening credits

First version (pilot)
This sequence consisted of a purple family portrait book, with pictures of the cast (including a picture of George at his construction job), set to the original version of theme song. This version was only used on the original unaired version of the pilot; the broadcast version used the second variation. It surfaced on Antenna TV in 2015.

Second version (season one)
Similar to the original unaired pilot, but now with a beige family portrait book, some of the cast pictures changed (most notably, George at his construction job), and Leon Redbone singing the theme. The Redbone version would be used in all subsequent variations of the opening. On the Shout! Factory DVDs of seasons one & two, this was only seen on the broadcast version of the pilot.

Third version (season two)
The opening was overhauled completely beginning with this season. It begins with a stock photo of a British palace, and then zooms in to Mr. Belvedere himself. It was then followed by Belvedere as different people (including a Man on Safari), followed by photos and clips from season one episodes, as well as general photos of the cast from said season. On the Shout! Factory DVDs of seasons one & two, this version was kept as is on all the season two episodes, but plastered the season one opening on episodes 2–7. In addition, the show adopted its familiar logo.

Fourth version (seasons three through six)
The opening was overhauled completely once more in season three. Now, it began with Mr. Belvedere writing in his journal, followed by the camera zooming in to the fictional World Focus magazine, with Belvedere on the front cover for the title card. It was then followed by edited images of Belvedere with famous people from around the world. The photos were updated to reflect how the cast looked in season three, and most of the season one clips were now replaced with scenes from season two episodes. In season four, the opening was updated to feature new positions of Tracy Wells on the couch. In season six, it was updated once more to feature clips from season five episodes, and new positions of Brice Beckham on the couch. A short 30 second version was also created, as well. In early syndication reruns, the short season four/five opening was used on all the episodes, with the exception of season six; early reruns of season six used the short open from said season.

Ratings and cancellation
Mr. Belvedere did not place within Nielsen's Top 30 shows at any time during its six-season run, but it did have a relatively solid ratings base, and often won its time slot.

Its first season (1985) was exempt from the Nielsen ratings as it aired too few episodes before the end of April to be counted. In its second season (1985–86), the series ranked at #45 with a 14.8 rating.

During season three (1986–87), the show fell to 51st place with a 13.7 rating. At the end of the 1986–87 season, ABC decided to cancel the show after three seasons, but negative feedback from fans of the series led the network to reverse its decision and order a fourth season that debuted in October 1987. In season four (1987–88), the show fell to 64th place and an 11.5 rating for the year. For its fifth season (1988–89), the show rose to a 12.2 rating, placing it at #47 for the season.

For its sixth and final season (1989–90), Mr. Belvedere left its longtime Friday night slot (which began its evolution into the long-running TGIF block that season) and was moved to 8:00 p.m. Eastern Time on Saturday nights. The move led Mr. Belvedere to suffer a steep ratings decline, falling to a 6.3 rating. The final episode to air before it was put on hiatus on December 30, 1989 ranked #70 out of 83 shows. ABC canceled the series for good in February 1990. The two-part finale, which aired on July 1 and July 8, 1990, ranked #59 and #37, respectively, out of the 86 shows that aired during those weeks.

Syndication
In addition to its existing prime time airings, ABC aired reruns of the first three seasons of Mr. Belvedere on the network's daily daytime schedule from September 7, 1987 to January 15, 1988, filling the gap between the cancellation of the game show Bargain Hunters and the premiere of the talk show Home.

On September 11, 1989 (about the time the show entered its final season), and continuing in sporadically until 1997, it was seen in local syndication on select Fox affiliates. Along with the addition of seasons four through six, ten previously unaired episodes (two from season five and eight from season six), were also added to the syndication package. The syndication package initially consisted of all 95 half-hour episodes produced up until the end of season five in 1989; the following year, season six (the remaining 22 half-hour episodes) was finally included in the package.

In the early 2000s, reruns of the series aired on Foxnet (a master feed of the Fox network for markets without a local affiliate, which aired syndicated programs outside of network programming), and on CTS in Canada from 2002 to 2004.

In December 2009, American Life Network aired both of the series' Christmas-themed episodes, as part of the network's month-long block of holiday-centered episodes of series from 20th Century Fox Television (season four's "Christmas Story" and season six's "A Happy Guy's Christmas"). This was the first time in over a decade that Mr. Belvedere was syndicated in U.S. On or around October 3, 2011, reruns began airing on FamilyNet, marking the first time that the series had been regularly syndicated in over 15 years. Around November 2012, Dish Network began broadcasting FamilyNet's successor channel, Rural TV, making the show viewable throughout the U.S. on weeknights (with commercial bumpers intact briefly). On January 5, 2015, Antenna TV began airing reruns of the series, initially airing seven days a week. These have been completely unedited, and include alternate pilot credits without Leon Redbone singing. It aired until April 1, 2018.

Home media
Shout! Factory (under license from 20th Century Fox Home Entertainment) has released the first four seasons of Mr. Belvedere on DVD in Region 1, featuring the original unedited prints of the episodes. Currently, Shout! Factory does not have the DVD rights to seasons five and six, and has been involved in protracted negotiations to acquire those remaining episodes (46 in total) for future releases.

In September 2015, Shout! re-released season 4 on DVD as a full retail release.

♦ - Shout! Factory Exclusives title, sold exclusively through Shout's online store.

Awards and nominations

See also

 Charles in Charge (1984)
 Gimme a Break! (1981)
 Who's the Boss? (1984)

References

External links
 
 

1980s American sitcoms
1985 American television series debuts
1990s American sitcoms
1990 American television series endings
American Broadcasting Company original programming
Fictional immigrants to the United States
Television series about families
Television series by 20th Century Fox Television
Television shows set in Pittsburgh